Tonya Mosley is an Emmy and Murrow award-winning radio and television journalist and podcaster. Prior to 2022, Mosley co-hosted NPR and WBUR's midday talk show Here & Now along with Robin Young and Scott Tong. In 2015, she was awarded the John S. Knight journalism fellowship at Stanford. She hosts the podcast Truth Be Told, an advice show about race from KQED.

Mosley won an Emmy Award in 2016 for her televised piece "Beyond Ferguson," and a national Edward R. Murrow award for her public radio series "Black in Seattle."  In 2010 Tonya Mosley created NewNaturalista.com. The popular site focused on healthy living, social justice, mental well-being, natural hair and building wealth for women of color.

Before public radio and podcasting Mosley worked as a reporter and weekend anchor at NBC33 in Fort Wayne, Indiana, FOX 41 in Louisville, Kentucky, KING 5 in Seattle and behind the scenes as a producer in several markets including Columbia, Missouri, Lansing, Michigan, Flint, Michigan and Detroit, Michigan.  Mosley reported for Al Jazeera America and KUOW. She has also been the Silicon Valley chief of San Francisco's public radio station KQED.

Mosley is originally from Detroit.

References

American podcasters
American radio journalists
NPR personalities
American radio DJs
American television journalists
African-American women journalists
African-American journalists
Year of birth missing (living people)
Living people
American women radio journalists
American women television journalists
People from Detroit
Journalists from Michigan
20th-century American journalists
21st-century American journalists
University of Missouri alumni
Emmy Award winners
20th-century African-American women
20th-century African-American people
21st-century American women
American women podcasters
21st-century African-American women
21st-century African-American people